John Broome (born 1947) is a British philosopher and economist. He was the White's Professor of Moral Philosophy at the University of Oxford and a Fellow of Corpus Christi College, Oxford.

Biography
Broome was educated at the University of Cambridge, at the University of London and at the Massachusetts Institute of Technology, where he received a PhD in economics. Before arriving at Oxford he was Professor of Philosophy at the University of St. Andrews and, prior to that, Professor of Economics and Philosophy at the University of Bristol. He has held visiting posts at the University of Virginia, the Australian National University, Princeton University, the University of Washington, the University of British Columbia, the Swedish Collegium for Advanced Study in the Social Sciences, and the University of Canterbury. In 2007 Broome was elected a Foreign Member of the Royal Swedish Academy of Sciences.

His book Weighing Goods (1991) explores the way in which goods "located" in each of the three "dimensions" — time, people, states of nature—make up overall goodness. Broome argues that these dimensions are linked by what he calls the interpersonal addition theorem, which supports the utilitarian principle of distribution. In his book Weighing Lives (2004), Broome rejects the presumed intuition that adding people to the population is ethically neutral. In his collection of papers, titled Ethics out of Economics (1999), he discusses topics such as value, equality, fairness, and utility.

Selected bibliography

Books

Chapters in books

See also
Derek Parfit

References

External links
John Broome's home page at the University of Oxford. Includes a full list of publications and links to online papers.

Living people
1947 births
People from Kuala Lumpur
Alumni of the University of London
Members of the Royal Swedish Academy of Sciences
White's Professors of Moral Philosophy
Fellows of Corpus Christi College, Oxford
20th-century British philosophers
21st-century British philosophers